Shifnal railway station is a railway station which serves the town of Shifnal in Shropshire, England. The station is managed by West Midlands Trains, who provide the majority of services that call here (it is also served by Transport for Wales, primarily on Sundays).

The station (opened in 1849) is located on a viaduct/causeway high above the village itself. It is on the Shrewsbury to Wolverhampton Line. When Shifnal was controlled by semaphore signalling it boasted a three-storey signal box.  The building by the entrance at street level is not in railway use and there are no permanent buildings left at platform level.

Facilities
The station is unstaffed, but does have a ticket machine.  Waiting shelters are provided on both platforms and service running information is given via CIS displays, timetable poster boards and customer help points on each side.  Level access is possible from the car park on the Birmingham-bound platform (1) only - the main entrance on Market Place is below platform level and is only accessible via a staircase, whilst the footbridge between the two platforms also has steps.

Services
This service is operated by Class 170s in 2 and 4 carriage configuration (previously also by 3 car sets however, all middle carriages from these trains have since been transferred  to strengthen the CrossCountry class 170 fleet). As of 2022, British Rail Class 196 trains have began operations on the line, they will replace the old 170 units. Additional trains also call at peak periods. Sunday services are hourly calling at all stations.

References

Further reading

External links

Railway stations in Shropshire
DfT Category F2 stations
Former Great Western Railway stations
Railway stations in Great Britain opened in 1849
Railway stations served by West Midlands Trains
Railway stations served by Transport for Wales Rail
1849 establishments in England
Shifnal